The Korea national handball team was a representative side which was composed of players from both South Korea and North Korea.

The team competed at the 2019 World Championship as "Korea".

2019 World Championship
The team had to have four players from North Korea. Because of this rule the team was allowed to have 20 players in the team instead of 16. The team played with the country abbreviation COR.

World Championship record

Current squad
Squad for the 2019 World Men's Handball Championship.

Head coach: Cho Young-shin

References

External links
 (South Korea)
IHF profile (North Korea)
IHF profile (South Korea)

Korea
Handball in South Korea
Handball in North Korea
Men's sport in Korea
2018 establishments in South Korea
2019 disestablishments in South Korea
handball